The men's flyweight event was part of the boxing programme at the 1948 Summer Olympics. The weight class was the lightest contested, and allowed boxers of up to 51 kilograms. The competition was held from Saturday, 7 August 1948 to Friday, 13 August 1948. Twenty-six boxers from 26 nations competed.

Prior to the competition beginning, eventual gold medallist Pascual Perez was disqualified for being overweight. It was quickly discovered that officials had confused Perez with his bantamweight teammate Arnoldo Pares, and he was reinstated back into the competition.

Medalists

Results

References

External links
 

Flyweight